This article contains a complete list of locks and weirs on the River Lea/River Lee Navigation from Hertford downstream.

There are also weirs upstream. While the river above Hertford is not deep enough to support barges or narrow boats, it is navigable by row boats, canoes and kayaks.

Locks and weirs
 Hertford Weir
 Hertford Lock
 Ware Weir
 Ware Lock
 Hardmead Lock
 Stanstead Lock
 Feildes Weir
 Feildes Weir Lock
 Dobbs Weir Lock
 Carthagena Weir
 Carthagena Lock
 Aqueduct Lock
 Cheshunt Lock
 Waltham Common Lock
 Waltham Town Lock
 Rammey Marsh Lock
 Newmans Weir
 Enfield Lock
 Ponder's End Lock
 Pickett's Lock
 Stonebridge Lock
 Tottenham Lock
 Pond Lane Flood Gates
 Middlesex Filter Beds Weir
 Old Ford Lock
 Bromley Stop Lock
 Britannia Stop Lock
 Bow Locks
 Prescott Lock (under construction, and also known as Three Mills Lock)
 Three Mills Wall River Weir

Weirs on the River Lea